Karl Andree (20 October 1808 – 10 August 1875) was a German geographer.

Biography
Andree was born in Braunschweig.  He was educated at Jena, Göttingen, and Berlin.  After having been implicated in a students' political agitation he became a journalist, and in 1851 founded the newspaper Bremer Handelsblatt. From 1855, however, he devoted himself entirely to geography and ethnography, working successively at Leipzig and at Dresden.  During the American Civil War, he advocated the cause of the secessionists.  In 1862 he founded the important geographical periodical Globus. He died at Wildungen. His son Richard Andree followed in his father's career.

Works
Nordamerika in geographischen und geschichtlichen Umrissen (Brunswick, 1854)
Buenos Ayres und die argentinische Republik (Leipzig, 1856)
Geographische Wanderungen (Dresden, 1859)
Geographie des Welthandels (Stuttgart, 1867-1872)

References

Attribution

1808 births
1875 deaths
Writers from Braunschweig
People from the Duchy of Brunswick
German geographers
University of Jena alumni
University of Göttingen alumni
Humboldt University of Berlin alumni